Wheelabrator Baltimore is a waste-to-energy incinerator located in the Westport neighborhood of Baltimore, Maryland and is operated by Wheelabrator Technologies, a subsidiary of Energy Capital Partners. It has an electric generation capacity of 64.5 megawatts. On October 2, 2018, ECP announced the agreement to sell Wheelabrator Technologies to Macquarie Infrastructure Partners, a subsidiary of Macquarie Group.

Operation
In operation since 1985, the incinerator's tall white smokestack that reads "Baltimore" is considered to be a distinctive landmark for travelers on nearby Interstate 95 and the Baltimore-Washington Parkway. Formally known as BRESCO (Baltimore Refuse Energy Systems Co.), the incinerator has been plagued by controversy over air pollution and for operating with an expired air pollution permit. The ash produced at the incinerator is then used for the city's Quarantine Road landfill at Hawkins Point.

In 2010, several environmental groups, including the Washington, D.C. based Environmental Integrity Project (EIP), the Baltimore Harbor Waterkeeper, the Chesapeake Climate Action Network, and Clean Water Action have successfully intervened in the Wheelabrator's permit-renewal process, which prompted the U.S. Environmental Protection Agency (EPA) to order the Maryland Department of the Environment (MDE) to reinforce the plant's pollution-monitoring necessities.

According to a 2011 report by the EIP, the Wheelabrator Incinerator produces more mercury, lead, and greenhouse gases per hour of energy than each of the state's four largest coal-fired power plants. In addition, the incinerator produces nitrogen oxide emissions, which can contribute to smog and pollution in the Chesapeake Bay. EIP staff attorney Jennifer Peterson stated:  

In 2021, the Wheelabrator Incinerator was Baltimore's "single largest standing source of air pollution."

References

External links 
Wheelabrator Baltimore, L.P. waste-to-energy facility webpage
Environmentalists urge new permit for incinerator

Energy infrastructure completed in 1985
Towers completed in 1985
Buildings and structures in Baltimore
Waste power stations in the United States
Towers in Maryland
Westport, Baltimore
1985 establishments in Maryland